Westward Ho the Wagons! is a 1956 American Western film starring Fess Parker and Kathleen Crowley and produced by Walt Disney Productions. Based on Mary Jane Carr's novel Children of the Covered Wagon, the film was produced by Bill Walsh, directed by William Beaudine, and released to theatres on December 20, 1956 by Buena Vista Distribution Company. The supporting cast features Jeff York, Sebastian Cabot (in his first film role for Disney), David Stollery, and George Reeves (his final feature film appearance).

Plot 
A small group of families join together to travel to Oregon in 1846. Their leader is ostensibly James Stephen (George Reeves, TV's Superman), who has made the trip before, and is now bringing his family along. John Grayson (Fess Parker, TV's "Davy Crockett" and Daniel Boone), known as Doc for his ambition to study medicine, however, proves to be the real leader of the wagon train.

The pioneers deal with the elements and occasional raids, but after hostile Pawnees drive off their spare horses, they realize they may not make it to the Oregon Territory. While stopping at Fort Laramie, the pioneer children make friends with Sioux children. After the Sioux chief's son is injured in an accident, Doc Grayson helps heal him, earning the trust of the Sioux. As the story ends, the Sioux warriors escort the wagon train safely through Pawnee territory.

Cast 
Fess Parker as John 'Doc' Grayson
Kathleen Crowley as Laura Thompson
Jeff York as Hank Breckenridge
David Stollery as Dan Thompson
Sebastian Cabot as Bissonette
George Reeves as James Stephen
Doreen Tracey as Bobo Stephen
Morgan Woodward as Obie Foster
Barbara Woodell as Mrs. Stephen
Iron Eyes Cody as Many Stars
John War Eagle as Wolf's Brother
Anthony Numkena as Little Thunder
Cubby O'Brien as Jerry Stephen
Karen Pendleton as Myra Thompson
Tommy Cole as Jim Stephen
Jane Liddell as Ruth Benjamin
Leslie Bradley as Spencer Armitage
Jon Locke as Ed Benjamin

Additionally, several actors appear in the film uncredited. They include: Max Wagner as a Wagon man; Chuck Courtney as a Wagon man, Gertrude Astor as a Wagon woman, Eddie Little Sky as a Pawnee Indian, and Carl Mathews as an Indian.

Songs 
 Westward Ho the Wagons! - lyrics by Tom Blackburn and music by George Bruns 
 The Ballad of John Colter - lyrics by Tom Blackburn and music by George Bruns 
 Wringle Wrangle - written by Stan Jones 
 "I'm Lonely, My Darlin'" (based on Green Grow the Lilacs, Traditional) - lyrics by Fess Parker and music arrangement by George Bruns 
 Pioneer's Prayer (from The Vanishing Prairie) - lyrics by Hazel "Gil" George and music by Paul Smith

Production
Fess Parker stars in the film, which also features the final big-screen appearance of George Reeves. It was released on videotape in 1986 then March 18, 1997. The film was shot in Janss Conejo Ranch, now known as Wildwood Regional Park in Thousand Oaks, California. Four Mousketeers from the "Mickey Mouse Club" were in the film: Tommy Cole, Doreen Tracey, Cubby O'Brian, and Karen Pendleton.

The film was only a moderate success, and received mixed reviews. Fess Parker's version of the song "Wringle Wrangle" from the movie was released as a single.

Reception
Variety noted, "Cinemascope treatment allows a vast panorama against which to limn the simple, yet stirring, narrative, and there's the marquee lure of Fess Parker for the younger trade particularly." Harrison's Reports wrote, "Set against highly impressive outdoor backgrounds and beautifully photographed in CinemaScope and Technicolor, this Walt Disney live-action western should go over well with the family trade, particularly the youngsters, for children play an important part in the proceedings." The Monthly Film Bulletin wrote, "Walt Disney's latest western adventure contains neither the excitement, the good humour nor the high spirits of his Davy Crockett films. There is a sense of strain; the humour hangs heavy; the action and its outcome is always predictable. The undaunted Fess Parker, however, remains as resolute as ever, and sings with the same charm and style."

See also
List of American films of 1956

References

External links
  

1956 films
1956 Western (genre) films
Walt Disney Pictures films
1950s English-language films
Films about Native Americans
Films based on American novels
Films directed by William Beaudine
Films produced by Bill Walsh (producer)
Films produced by Walt Disney
Films set in 1846
Films set in Wyoming
Films shot in California
Films adapted into comics
Films scored by George Bruns
American Western (genre) films
CinemaScope films
1950s American films